Sulaymān ibn Aḥmad ibn Sulaymān al-Mahrī (ca. 1480–1550) was a 16th-century Arab navigator. He came from Shihr, in Hadhramaut, eastern Yemen, and he was called “Al-Mahrī” because he was a descendant of the Arabic tribe of Mahra. His work continues and expands the work of Ibn Majid, but there is no explicit relation between them in any of their works.

Works

He sailed across the Indian Ocean and wrote a book on the geography of the Indian Ocean and the islands of Maritime Southeast Asia. He is best known for reducing Ibn Majids's list of stars for navigation from 70 to 15. Combinations of these lists of stars were used by Arab navigators and mariners up to the early 16th century.

The 15th-century Arabic book Kitab al-Fawa'id fi wal al-ilmi al bahri wa'l qawa'id (Book of Useful Information on the Principles and Rules of Navigation) was compiled by Ibn Majid and his student Sulaiman Al Mahri. In his journals, Al Mahri noted the islands off the west coast of Siam (Malaya). The most important destination covered by these navigational texts is Malacca, which had become the region's principal trading center for Arab navigators during the 15th century. Singapore, parts of Samarra, Java, China, the coasts of Burma and Andaman and Nicobar Islands were the fiscal points of his texts.

He grouped the shores of Malaya with Siam, and the mainland to the east with China as a single kingdom. This passage from Al-Mahri's book illustrates the limits of Arab navigators: Know that to the south of the Island of Jawa are found many Islands called Timor and that to the east of Timor are the Islands of Bandam, also a large number. The latter are places sandalwood, aloeswood and mace. The island is called Isles of Clove as airs of Jawa are called Maluku islands. Since many of the islands have not been identified with confidence, the extent of his travel and familiarity with the region is not known.

Al Mahri's division of Andaman and Nicobar Islands into two parts helped Arab and Portuguese navigators. Even in the mid-16th century Sidi Ali Celeb translated Al Mahri's texts into Turkish and embroidered his work.

See also
Islamic scholars
List of Arab scientists and scholars

External links
 Technical note on Indian Ocean Arab Navigation Studies by J. Acevedo and I. Bénard of the RUTTER Project, listing all known manuscripts, editions and works of Sulayman al-Mahri.

References

Arab explorers
1480 births
1550 deaths
15th-century Arabs
16th-century Arabs
Navigators
16th-century geographers